MSHD may refer to:
 Mycothiol synthase, an enzyme
 Michigan Department of Transportation